Cheurfa Tizi Tegyar is a village in the Taourirt Ighil commune in Béjaïa Province, in the Kabylie region of Algeria.

External links

Populated places in Béjaïa Province